The Sri Lanka Hockey Federation is the governing body of field hockey in Sri Lanka. It is affiliated to IHF International Hockey Federation and AHF Asian Hockey Federation. The headquarters of the federation are in Colombo.

Sumith Edirisinghe is the President of the Sri Lanka Hockey Federation and Gamini Jayasinghe is the General Secretary.

See also
 Sri Lanka men's national field hockey team
 Sri Lanka women's national field hockey team

References

External links
 Sri Lanka Hockey Federation

Sri Lanka
Hockey
Field hockey in Sri Lanka